Rafael Silva dos Santos (born 8 October 1990), known as Rafael Silva or Rafa Silva, is a Brazilian professional footballer who plays as a forward for Série B club Ituano.

Honours

Club
Ituano
Campeonato Paulista: 2014
Vasco da Gama
Campeonato Carioca: 2015

References

External links

1990 births
Living people
Sportspeople from Bahia
Brazilian footballers
Association football forwards
Campeonato Brasileiro Série A players
Campeonato Brasileiro Série B players
Primeira Liga players
UAE Pro League players
China League One players
Iraqi Premier League players
Liga 1 (Indonesia) players
Bolivian Primera División players
Associação Portuguesa de Desportos players
Esporte Clube Noroeste players
Ituano FC players
CR Vasco da Gama players
Cruzeiro Esporte Clube players
Guarani FC players
Gil Vicente F.C. players
Hatta Club players
Dalian Transcendence F.C. players
Madura United F.C. players
PS Barito Putera players
Club Always Ready players
Al-Shorta SC players
Brazilian expatriate footballers
Brazilian expatriate sportspeople in Portugal
Brazilian expatriate sportspeople in China
Brazilian expatriate sportspeople in the United Arab Emirates
Brazilian expatriate sportspeople in Bolivia
Brazilian expatriate sportspeople in Iraq
Brazilian expatriate sportspeople in Indonesia
Expatriate footballers in Portugal
Expatriate footballers in China
Expatriate footballers in the United Arab Emirates
Expatriate footballers in Bolivia
Expatriate footballers in Iraq
Expatriate footballers in Indonesia